Kan Educational (Kan Hinuchit) is a public television channel in Israel designated for children, on behalf of the Israel Broadcasting Corporation. The channel launched on August 15, 2018 and replaced Israeli Educational Television, which preceded it. It now broadcasts existing IETV programs including older and newer programs, as well as providing new seasons to some of those programs, and also introduce new series along the way. All of its content will be bought from third parties, unlike IETV who produced many of their shows in-house.

History 
Following a reform in public broadcasting initiated by the government and approved by the Knesset in the summer of 2014, the Israeli Broadcasting Authority was replaced in 2017 by the Israeli Broadcasting Corporation (aka KAN).

On 15 August 2018, the Israeli Educational Television was shut down and has been replaced by a new kids and youth channel named KAN Educational, now a part of the Israel Public Broadcasting Corporation.

The channel moved from Channel 23 to Channel 80 on January 5, 2021.

Programming

Original Shows 

 Anachnu Kan (אנחנו כאן)
 Ateret Hatzeva (אתגר הצבע)
  (בלוגה בלוז)
  (קפה עמליה)
 Caramel (כראמל)
  (חיות רשת)
  (חיות שטח)
  (האחיין שלי בנץ)
  (הבאר)
  (המתחם ה-25)
  (השמרטפים)
  (השופטת ליטל)
  (עיר המספרים)
  (כל עוד בלבב)
  (למה זה טוב?)
  (לבד בבית)
  (מקיף מילאנו)
  (?מי פה הבוס)
  (משחקי המוח)
 Mishpacha Be'oto (משפחה באוטו)
  (מיוחדת)
 Parpar Nechmad - New Version (פרפר נחמד - גרסה חדשה)
 Rak BeHatzbaa (רק בהצבעה)
 Sha'at Sipur Im Nasi Hamedinah (שעת סיפור עם נשיא המדינה)
  (שקשוקה)
  (סליחה על השאלה)
 VeHaYeled HaZe Hu Ani (והילד הזה הוא אני)
  (ילדי בית העץ)

Shows from Israeli Educational Television 

 Avudim BaRibua (אבודים בריבוע)
 Bahatzer Shel Pupik (בחצר של פופיק)
 BaHeder Shel Hanny (בחדר של חני)
 BeSod HaYinyanim (בסוד העניינים)
 Bli Sodot (בלי סודות)
 Dan VeMuesli (דן ומוזלי)
 Esrim Plus (עשרים פלוס)
 BaBait Shel Fistuk (בבית של פיסטוק)
 HaChafranim (החפרנים)
 HaYeladim MiSchoonat Hayim (הילדים משכונת חיים)
 Hayot Bama (חיות במה)
 Hayot Bama Live! (חיות במה בהופעה)
 Heshbon Pashoot (חשבון פשוט)
 Inyan Shel Zman (עניין של זמן)
 Keshet VeAnan (קשת וענן)
 Knesset Nichbada (כנסת נכבדה)
 Kriyat Kivun (קריאת כיוון)
 Tiruu Oti (תראו אותי)
 Ma HaSipur? (מה הסיפור?)
 Ma Pitom?! (!?מה פתאום)
 Ma Ze Muze (מה זה מוזה)
 Matti HaBalash HaMathemati (מתי בלש מתמטי)
 HaIIparon Hachi Mechudad (העיפרון הכי מחודד)
 Olam HaBubot Shel Gali (עולם הבובות של גלי)
 Parpar Nechmad (פרפר נחמד)
 Philo and Sophy (פילו וסופי)
 Rechov Sumsum (רחוב סומסום)
 Rega im Dodley (רגע עם דודלי)
 Shuster VeShuster (שוסטר ושוסטר)
 Shraga Bishgada (שרגא בישגדא)
 Tzemer VeYaeli (צמר ויעלי)
 Yaldey Beit HaEtch (ילדי בית העץ)

Shows from Channel 1 (Israel) 

 Chayot VeChiyuchim (חיות וחיוכים)
 Rosh Kroov (ראש כרוב)
 Carousela (קרוסלה)
 Foxy Fables (משלים שועליים)
 Hopa Hey (הופה היי)
 Jinji (ג'ינג'י)
 Mesibat Gan (מסיבת גן)
 HaChofesh HaAcharon (החופש האחרון)
 Agadot HaMelech Shlomo (אגדות המלך שלמה)
 Sammy VeSusu (סמי וסוסו)
 Lo Kolel Sheirut (לא כולל שירות)
 HaChatul Shmeel (החתול שמיל)
 Tlooim BaAvir (תלויים באוויר)
 Kach Sikuy (קח סיכוי)
 HaTzrif Shel Tamari (הצריף של תמרי)
 Telepele (טלפלא)
 Shalosh Arba Hamesh VaChetzi (שלוש ארבע חמש וחצי)
 Tofsim Rosh (תופסים ראש)
 Toses (תוססס)
 Smoch Alay (סמוך עליי)
 HaTsatskanim (הצצקנים)
 Tzipi Bli Hafsaka (ציפי בלי הפסקה)
 Zap LaRishon (זאפ לראשון)
 Rich Rach (ריץ' רץ')

Imported TV shows broadcast on Kan Educational 
Beat Bugs
Dinosaur Train
Dot.
Fraggle Rock
Gigantosaurus
Hero Elementary
Johnny Test (2021 TV series)
Llama Llama
The Littl' Bits
Martha Speaks
Miraculous: Tales of Ladybug & Cat Noir
The Ollie & Moon Show
Once Upon a Time... Life
Ready Jet Go!
Sadie Sparks
Shaun the Sheep
The Smurfs
Splash and Bubbles
The Storyteller
Zack & Quack

References

External links

Television channels and stations established in 2018
Television channels in Israel
2018 establishments in Israel
Educational and instructional television channels
Children's television networks